Santiago is the capital city of Chile.

Santiago may also refer to:

Four other notable cities often referred to as simply "Santiago":
Santiago de Compostela, Spain
Santiago de Cuba, Cuba
Santiago de los Caballeros, Dominican Republic
Santiago, Isabela, Philippines

Other places

Argentina
Santiago del Estero Province
Santiago del Estero, capital of the province

Brazil
Santiago, Rio Grande do Sul

Cape Verde
Santiago, Cape Verde

Chile
Santiago (commune)
Santiago Province, Chile
Santiago Metropolitan Region

Colombia
Santiago, Norte de Santander
Santiago, Putumayo
Santiago de Cali

Costa Rica
Santiago District, Palmares
Santiago District, Paraíso
Santiago District, Puriscal
Santiago District, San Rafael
Santiago District, San Ramón

Cuba
Santiago de Cuba Province
Santiago de Cuba, capital of the province
 Battle of Santiago de Cuba
 Santiago de las Vegas

Dominican Republic
Santiago Province (Dominican Republic)

Ecuador
Santiago de Guayaquil, coastal city
Santiago de Quito, 1534 Spanish settlement in Colta Canton, Chimborazo, moved north later that year and renamed San Francisco de Quito
Santiago Island (Galápagos)

Guatemala
Santiago Sacatepéquez, Guatemala
Santiago Atitlán, Guatemala, the capital of the Tz'utujil people in pre-Columbian times

Jamaica
Santiago, a Spanish possession that later became Jamaica
Spanish Town or Santiago de la Vega, Jamaica

Mexico
Querétaro City, Querétaro
Santiago el Pinar, Chiapas
Santiago, Nuevo León
Santiago, Baja California Sur
Santiago River (Eastern Mexico), a river of Veracruz
Santiago River (Mexico), the outlet of Lake Chapala and the longest river entirely in Mexico
Santiago Maravatío, Guanajuato
Santiago Tianguistenco, a city in the State of México
Santiago, Oaxaca (disambiguation), several places
Baluarte de Santiago, a fortification in Veracruz
Santiago Ixcuintla, a city in Nayarit

Nicaragua
León, Nicaragua or Santiago de los Caballeros de León

Panama
Santiago District, Veraguas, a district of Veraguas Province
Santiago (corregimiento), the seat of Santiago District
Santiago de Veraguas, the capital of Veraguas Province

Paraguay
Santiago, Paraguay, a town and district in Misiones Department

Peru
Santiago District, in Cusco Province of the Cusco Region
Santiago de Surco, a district of Lima
Santiago de Chuco, Santiago de Chuco District, a province of the La Libertad region
Santiago River (Peru), a tributary of the Marañón River

Philippines
Santiago, Agusan del Norte
Santiago, Ilocos Sur
 Cape Santiago, a cape at the southwestern tip of Luzon
 Santiago Island (Pangasinan), an island off of western Luzon

Portugal
Santiago (Lisbon), a parish in the municipality of Lisbon
Santiago (Tavira), a parish in the municipality of Tavira
Santiago do Cacém, a parish and a municipality in the Setúbal
Santiago de Piães, a parish in the municipality of Cinfães
Vale de Santiago, a parish in the municipality of Odemira
Santiago Maior (Beja), a parish in the municipality of Beja, Portugal

Puerto Rico
 Santiago River (Puerto Rico), a short river in Naguabo
 Caño de Santiago, a channel in Yabucoa, Puerto Rico

Spain
Santiago (Valdés), a parish in the municipality of Valdés, Asturias
Santiago (Sariego), a parish in the municipality of Sariego
Santiago (comarca), a comarca in the province of A Coruña
Santiago del Teide, Tenerife, Canary Islands
Playa Santiago, La Gomera, Canary Islands

Taiwan
 Cape Santiago (Taiwan), a cape at the northeastern tip of Taiwan

United States
Santiago, West Virginia
Santiago Canyon, California
Santiago Peak, a mountain in Orange County, California
Santiago High School (Garden Grove, California), Garden Grove, California
Santiago High School (Corona, California), Corona, California
Santiago Township, Sherburne County, Minnesota
Santiago, Minnesota, an unincorporated community
Santiago, Pennsylvania, an unincorporated community

Uruguay
Montevideo or San Felipe y Santiago de Montevideo

Venezuela
Santiago de León de Caracas
Santiago de Los Caballeros de Mérida, Venezuela

People
Santiago (name), a Spanish given name
Santiago (surname)
James the Great, one of the Twelve Apostles of Jesus
Santiago (footballer, born 1976), full name Elisandro Naressi Roos, Brazilian footballer
Santiago (footballer, born 1980), full name Petrony Santiago de Barros, Brazilian footballer
Santiago (footballer, born 1984), full name Rafael Santiago Maria, Brazilian footballer

Ships
 Santiago, one of the ships of the Magellan Expedition
 Santiago (1551), a supply ship of the Spanish Armada that wrecked south of Bergen, Norway, in 1588
 Santiago (1856), a British barque, now in the Garden Island Ships' Graveyard near Port Adelaide, Australia
 Santiago, an American schooner barge that operated with the SS Appomattox until its wreck

Media and entertainment
Santiago (album), a 1996 album by The Chieftains
Santiago (band), an American indie/punk band
"Santiago", a song by Loreena McKennitt from The Mask and Mirror
Santiago (1956 film), an American film directed by Gordon Douglas
Santiago (2007 film), a Brazilian film directed by João Moreira Salles

Other uses
 Santiago (genus), a genus of Eucerine bees
 Santiago (horse), racehorse, winner of the 2020 Irish Derby
 Santiago (The Vampire Chronicles), in Anne Rice's novel Interview with the Vampire
 Santiago (volleyball club), a women's team in Santiago, Dominican Republic
 ¡Santiago!, a shortened form of the Reconquista battle cry "Santiago y cierra, España"
 Order of Santiago, a Spanish knightly order
 Tarta de Santiago, an almond cake or pie from Spain with origin in the Middle Ages
 A nickname for the version 6 beta of the Red Hat Enterprise Linux operating system
 Santiaogou Republic, an historical Chinese kongsi federation in Borneo, sometimes spelled "Santiago Republic"

See also
Santiago Island (disambiguation)
Santiago Maior (disambiguation)
Santiago Province (disambiguation)
Santiago River (disambiguation)

Saint James (disambiguation)
San Diego (disambiguation)
Diogo (disambiguation)